Ingvar Svensson (born 16 December 1939) is a Swedish former footballer and manager who played as a midfielder and made six appearances for the Sweden national team.

Club career
In his last two seasons before retiring as a player, Svensson twice was Swedish football champion with Åtvidabergs FF, winning the Allsvenskan of 1972 and 1973.

International career
Svensson made his debut for Sweden on 5 October 1966 in a friendly match against Austria, which finished as a 4–1 win. He went on to make six appearances, scoring one goal, before making his last appearance on 25 June 1967 in a 1964–67 Nordic Football Championship match against Denmark, which finished as a 1–1 draw.

Managerial career
After retiring as a player, Svensson became manager of Jönköpings Södra IF from 1974 to 1976. In 1977, he became manager of Åtvidabergs FF where he remained until 1979, leading the club to promotion to the Allsvenskan in his first season.

Career statistics

International

International goals

Honours

Club
Åtvidabergs FF
 Allsvenskan: 1972, 1973

References

External links
 
 
 
 Swedish Football Association profile

1939 births
Living people
Swedish footballers
Swedish football managers
Sweden under-21 international footballers
Sweden international footballers
Association football midfielders
IFK Göteborg players
Åtvidabergs FF players
Allsvenskan players
Jönköpings Södra IF managers
Åtvidabergs FF managers